Ma is the sixth studio album by rock band Rare Earth, released in April 1973. It marks another change because none of the tracks were composed or written by the band. All composing and producing was done by the famous producer Norman Whitfield with a little help from Barrett Strong, a longtime collaborator of Whitfield.

Track listing
All tracks composed by Norman Whitfield; except where indicated

Side one
 "Ma" – 17:21

Side two
 "Big John Is My Name" – 4:06
 "Smiling Faces Sometimes" (Norman Whitfield, Barrett Strong) - 6:20
 "Hum Along and Dance" (Norman Whitfield, Barrett Strong) - 5:15
 "Come With Me" - 4:30

Personnel
Rare Earth
Gil Bridges – flute, saxophone, vocals
Peter Hoorelbeke – drums, percussion, lead vocals
Ray Monette – lead guitar, vocals
Mark Olson – keyboards, vocals
Mike Urso – bass guitar, vocals
Edward Guzman – congas, timbales

References

Rare Earth (band) albums
1973 albums
Motown albums
Albums produced by Norman Whitfield